The 1982 Detroit Tigers finished in fourth place in the American League East with a record of 83-79 (.512), 12 games behind the AL Champion Brewers.  The Tigers outscored their opponents 729 to 685.  The Tigers drew 1,636,058 fans to Tiger Stadium in 1982, ranking 7th of the 14 teams in the American League.

Offseason 
 October 5, 1981: Mark Fidrych was released by the Tigers.
 December 9, 1981: Dan Schatzeder and Mike Chris were traded by the Tigers to the San Francisco Giants for Larry Herndon.
 December 14, 1981: Dennis Kinney was released by the Tigers.
 March 4, 1982: Champ Summers was traded by the Tigers to the San Francisco Giants for Enos Cabell and cash.

Regular season

Season standings

Record vs. opponents

Roster

Player stats

Batting

Starters by position 
Note: Pos = Position; G = Games played; AB = At bats; H = Hits; Avg. = Batting average; HR = Home runs; RBI = Runs batted in

Other batters 
Note: G = Games played; AB = At bats; H = Hits; Avg. = Batting average; HR = Home runs; RBI = Runs batted in

Note: pitchers' batting statistics not included

Pitching

Starting pitchers 
Note: G = Games; IP = Innings pitched; W = Wins; L = Losses; ERA = Earned run average; SO = Strikeouts

Other pitchers 
Note: G = Games pitched; IP = Innings pitched; W = Wins; L = Losses; ERA = Earned run average; SO = Strikeouts

Relief pitchers 
Note: G = Games pitched; W= Wins; L= Losses; SV = Saves; GF = Games finished; ERA = Earned run average; SO = Strikeouts

Award winners and league leaders 

Larry Herndon
 #2 in MLB in triples (13)
 #5 in AL in outs (470)
 #8 in MLB in times grounded into double plays (20)

Chet Lemon
 MLB leader in times hit by pitch (15)

Jack Morris
 #2 in AL in complete games (17)
 #2 in MLB in home runs allowed (37)
 #2 in MLB in earned runs allowed (120)
 #2 in AL in wild pitches (10)
 #2 in AL in batters faced (1107)
 #3 in AL in innings pitched (266-1/3)
 #4 in AL in shutouts (3)
 #4 in AL in losses (16)
 #5 in AL in wins (17)
 #5 in AL in games started (37)
 #8 in MLB in bases on balls allowed (96)

Lance Parrish
 AL Silver Slugger Award, catcher
 AL All Star Team, catcher
 Tiger of the Year Award, by Detroit baseball writers
 #4 in AL in at bats per home run (15.2)
 #5 in AL in home runs (32)
 #10 in MLB in slugging percentage (.529)Dan Petry #4 in AL in ERA (3.22)
 #4 in AL in bases on balls allowed (100)
 #5 in AL in wild pitches (9)Jerry Ujdur #2 in AL in hits allowed per 9 innings pitched (7.58)Milt Wilcox'''
 #3 in AL in hit batsmen (7)

Players ranking among top 100 all time at position 
The following members of the 1982 Detroit Tigers are among the Top 100 of all time at their position, as ranked by The Bill James Historical Baseball Abstract:
 Lance Parrish: 19th best catcher of all time
 Lou Whitaker: 13th best second baseman of all time
 Alan Trammell: 9th best shortstop of all time
 Kirk Gibson: 36th best left fielder of all time

Farm system

Notes

References 

 1982 Detroit Tigers Regular Season Statistics

Detroit Tigers seasons
Detroit Tigers season
Detroit Tiger
1982 in Detroit